Ellen Elizabeth Ferner (née Aley; 13 September 1869 – 3 November 1930) was a New Zealand artist, photographer and community leader.

Ferner was born in Auckland, New Zealand, on 13 September 1869. She died on 3 November 1930, aged 61, in Remuera, Auckland.

References

1869 births
1930 deaths
New Zealand artists
New Zealand photographers
New Zealand women artists
New Zealand women photographers
People from Auckland
Artists from Auckland
Photographers from Auckland